Since the early 1990s, American and International forensic science laboratories and practitioners have collaborated in Scientific Working Groups (SWGs) to improve discipline practices and build consensus standards. In 2014, the SWGs are being reorganized under the NIST Organization for Scientific Area Committees (OSAC).

As of January 2012, active SWGs included the following:

 FISWG - Facial Identification Scientific Working Group
 SWGANTH - Forensic Anthropology
 SWGCBRN - Chemical, Biological, Radiological and Nuclear
 SWGDAM - DNA Analysis
 SWGDE - Digital Evidence
 SWGDMI - Medicolegal Death Investigation
 SWGDOC - Questioned Documents
 SWGDOG - Dogs and Orthogonal Detection
 SWGDRUG - Analysis of Seized Drugs
 SWGDVI - Disaster Victim Identification
 SWGFAST - Latent Fingerprints
 SWGFEX - Fire and Explosives Scenes
 SWGGEO - Geological Materials
 SWGGSR - Gunshot Residue
 SWGGUN - Firearms and Toolmarks
 SWGIBRA - Illicit Business Records
 SWGIT - Imaging Technologies
 SWGMAT - Materials Analysis
 SWGSTAIN - Bloodstain Pattern Analysis
 SWGTOX - Toxicology
 SWGTREAD - Footwear and Tiretracks
 SWGWILD - Wildlife Forensics

Each SWG includes scientists working within the focus field.  Although a couple the above-listed SWGs have only American members, most also have international members.  Federal, state or local government forensic laboratory scientists are the most common SWG members, but many SWGs also include other experts such as private laboratory scientists, academia, independent consultants, attorneys and judges.

Most SWGs have public websites with discipline-specific resources including approved and draft for comment standards, best practices guidelines and related documents.

External links 

NIST list of SWGs
SWGDAM bylaws
Interpol Forensics
NIST OLES Forensics
American Society of Crime Laboratory Directors

Forensics organizations